KADY-LP was a low-power television station licensed to Sherman, Texas. It transmitted over UHF channel 34 and was owned by Una Vez Mas Holdings, LLC under the licensee Una Vez Mas Sherman License LLC.

Although Una Vez Mas usually affiliates its stations with Azteca America, LAT TV announced on April 10, 2007 that the station would become a LAT TV affiliate as of May 30. LAT TV had since ceased operations, and KADY-LP had never appeared in online TV listings. The station went off the air in October 2010.

A construction permit for K34HQ was first issued on 5 May 2004. The station changed its callsign to KADY-LP 16 May 2007, before it was licensed.

The station's license was cancelled by the Federal Communications Commission on June 9, 2014, for failure to file a license renewal application.

An unrelated full-power station that initially signed on the air on August 17, 1985, on channel 63 in Oxnard, California, as KTIE, held the KADY call letters from 1988 until 2004; in which year the station took on its current KBEH callsign. The station moved its city of license to Garden Grove, California, in 2017.

References

External links

Television stations in Texas
Television channels and stations established in 2004
Defunct television stations in the United States
Television channels and stations disestablished in 2014
2014 disestablishments in Texas
2004 establishments in Texas
ADY-LP